Montégut-Plantaurel is a commune in the Ariège department in southwestern France.

Geography
The Lèze flows through the northwestern part of the commune.

History
The Chateau de La Hille, was home to Jewish refugee children during the early 1940s.

Population

See also
Communes of the Ariège department

References

Communes of Ariège (department)
Ariège communes articles needing translation from French Wikipedia